End Time is the sixth and final studio album by grindcore band Brutal Truth. It was released on September 27, 2011, by Relapse Records on CD, LP, and as a deluxe CD box set, which includes "six bonus tracks, a 20-page booklet, six custom art flats, a marijuana-scented disc card, and more".

Writing
Using the track "End Time" as title track of the album was vocalist Kevin Sharpe's idea. Bassist Dan Lilker wrote the lyrics for the song "Twenty Bag": "It's about when we ran out of weed while we were writing. Semi-humorous, but actually quite important. [...] I wrote lyrics about how we do what we do." "Control Room" with "a whole bunch of loops and weird, noisy stuff" is the work of drummer Richard Hoak, Lilker and guitarist Erik Burker didn't perform on this song. The track is too long to fit on the vinyl version of the album.

Track listing

Personnel

Brutal Truth
 Kevin Sharp – vocals, production
 Dan Lilker – bass guitar, backing vocals, broken china cymbal, production
 Erik Burke – guitar, production
 Rich Hoak – drums, electronics, production

Additional musicians
 Robert Piotrowicz – analogue modular synthesizer, electronics (11)
 Adam Jennings – electronics (15)
 Mike Golen – electronics (15)
 Jason Soliday – electronics (15)
 Omar Gonzalez – electronics (15)

Technical personnel
 Doug White – recording
 Jason P.C. – mixing
 Scott Hull – mastering
 Orion Landau – artwork, art design
 Shauna Montrucchio – photos

References

2011 albums
Brutal Truth albums
Relapse Records albums